Anurag is a common Indian given name.

Anurag may also refer to:
 Anurag Engineering College in Kodad, Andhra Pradesh
 Anuraag (1973 film), a Hindi film starring Rajesh Khanna and Nutan
 Advanced Numerical Research and Analysis Group, an Indian national defense laboratory in Hyderabad
 Anurag, Bangladesh